Yellow Dog Linux (YDL) is a discontinued free and open-source operating system for high-performance computing on multi-core processor computer architectures, focusing on GPU systems and computers using the POWER7 processor. The original developer was Terra Soft Solutions, which was acquired by Fixstars in October 2008. Yellow Dog Linux was first released in the spring of 1999 for Apple Macintosh PowerPC-based computers. The most recent version, Yellow Dog Linux 7, was released on August 6, 2012. Yellow Dog Linux lent its name to the popular YUM Linux software updater, derived from YDL's YUP (Yellowdog UPdater) and thus called Yellowdog Updater, Modified.

Features

Yellow Dog Linux is based on Red Hat Enterprise Linux/CentOS and relies on the RPM Package Manager. Its software includes applications such as Ekiga (a voice-over-IP and videoconferencing application), GIMP (a raster graphics editor), Gnash (a free Adobe Flash player), gThumb (an image viewer), the Mozilla Firefox Web browser, the Mozilla Thunderbird e-mail and news client, the OpenOffice.org productivity suite, Pidgin (an instant messaging and IRC client), the Rhythmbox music player, and the KDE Noatun and Totem media players.

Starting with YDL version 5.0 'Phoenix', Enlightenment is the Yellow Dog Linux default desktop environment, although GNOME and KDE are also included.

Like other Linux distributions, Yellow Dog Linux supports software development with GCC (compiled with support for C, C++, Java, and Fortran), the GNU C Library, GDB, GLib, the GTK+ toolkit, Python, the Qt toolkit, Ruby and Tcl. Standard text editors such as Vim and Emacs are complemented with IDEs such as Eclipse and KDevelop, as well as by graphical debuggers such as KDbg. Standard document preparation tools such as TeX and LaTeX are also included.

Yellow Dog Linux includes software for running a Web server (such as Apache/httpd, Perl, and PHP), database server (such as MySQL and PostgreSQL), and network server (NFS and Webmin). Additional software is also included for running an enterprise server or a compute server or cluster, although two separate products from Terra Soft Solutions, called Yellow Dog Enterprise Linux (for enterprise servers) and Y-HPC (for compute servers/clusters), were specifically targeted toward those applications.

Although several other Linux distributions support the Power ISA, Yellow Dog Linux was distinguished for its focus on supporting the Apple Macintosh platform before the Mac transition to Intel processors. Before this transition, Terra Soft Solutions held the unique distinction of being the only company licensed by Apple to resell Apple computers with Linux pre-installed (or for that matter, with any operating system other than Mac OS X). Full support for AirPort (Apple's implementation of the IEEE 802.11b-1999 wireless networking standard), and partial support for AirPort Extreme, are also built into Yellow Dog Linux, as are support for Bluetooth and support for accessing the Internet over cellular phones.

Following the Mac transition to Intel processors, Yellow Dog Linux retargeted Fedora Core 5.0 and later to support the Sony PlayStation 3 and IBM pSeries platforms extensively, while retaining its longstanding support for PowerPC-based Apple hardware.

Distribution
Yellow Dog Linux was sold by Terra Soft Solutions (later Fixstars), who also marketed PlayStation 3 consoles, IBM workstations, and servers with Yellow Dog Linux pre-installed. As is the case with most other Linux distribution vendors, a portion of the revenue from the sale of those boxed distributions went toward development of the operating system and applications, which are made available as source code under various free and open-source licenses.

Notable implementations
Gaurav Khanna, a professor in the Physics Department at the University of Massachusetts, Dartmouth, built a message-passing based cluster using YDL and 16 PlayStation 3s. This cluster was the first such to generate published scientific results. Dubbed the "PS3 Gravity Grid", it performs astrophysical simulations of large supermassive black holes capturing smaller compact objects. Khanna claims that the cluster's performance exceeds that of a 100+ Intel Xeon core based traditional Linux cluster on his simulations. The PS3 Gravity Grid gathered significant media attention between 2007 and 2010.

Release history

References

External links
 Yellow Dog Linux on PS3
 Yellow Dog Linux home page
 
 penguinppc.org – Linux on PowerPC site
 Yellow Dog Linux archive

Reviews
 "Software Review: Yellow Dog Linux 5 for PlayStation 3"  – BlogCritics Magazine review of YDL version 5.0
 "Yellow Dog Linux 5.0 Hands-on" – IGN.com review of YDL version 5.0
 "Yellow Dog Linux 4.0: Some Install Notes" – ppcnerds.org review of YDL version 4.0

Cell BE architecture
Discontinued Linux distributions
Platform-specific Linux distributions
PlayStation 3 software
PowerPC operating systems
Linux distributions